The THF Sport Hall is an indoor arena for handball matches located in Ankara, Turkey. It is situated within the THF complex. The venue, having a seating capacity of 2,700, was opened in 2012.

Construction
The Turkish Ministry of Youth and Sports and the Turkey Handball Federation (THF) decided the building of a handball-dedicated sports venue in Ankara on May 23, 2011. The construction began with ground breaking on October 21, 2011, and completed in June 2012. The venue opened officially on October 3, 2013. The construction cost of 11 million (approx. US$ 6.145 as of October 2012) was funded by the ministry. The venue is situated at Yıldızevler, Hilal neighborhood of Çankaya district in Ankara.

Venues
The first event the venue hosted was a match for the 2013 World Women's Handball Championship qualification playoffs between the  national teams of Turkey and Azerbaijan played on the opening day. The tournament's all the Group D matches were held also at the THF Sport Hall. Qualified for the playoff round, the Turkish team will play their first leg match against the Danish nationals at the venue. The Turkey men's national handball team plays their home matches in the 2014 European Men's Handball Championship Qualification - Phase 2 at the THF Sport Hall.

The venue hosts all the Handball Super League and Women's Handball Super League matches scheduled in Ankara.

International competitions hosted
 2013 World Women's Handball Championship – European qualification
 2014 European Men's Handball Championship qualification
 2014 European Women's Handball Championship qualification
 2015 World Men's Handball Championship – European qualification
 2016 European Men's Handball Championship qualification
 2016 European Women's Handball Championship qualification

References

Sports venues in Ankara
Indoor arenas in Turkey
Handball venues in Turkey
Sports venues completed in 2012
Çankaya, Ankara